This is a list of flag bearers who have represented Pakistan at the Olympics.

Flag bearers carry the national flag of their country at the opening ceremony of the Olympic Games.

See also
Pakistan at the Olympics

References

Pakistan at the Olympics
Pakistan
Olympic flagbearers